Dominique Gillot (born 11 July 1949, in Conflans-Sainte-Honorine, France) is a French politician.  She is a member of the Socialist Party and was the French Minister of Health from 1999 to 2001, as well as a member of the 11th National Assembly from 1997 to 1999. In 2001, she was elected mayor of Éragny-sur-Oise. She was reelected in 2008 but lost her bid for a third term in March 2014 to her right-wing opponent.  She held the office of Senator of the French Republic since 2011. She did not seek reelection to the Senate when her term ended in 2017.

References

1949 births
Living people
Socialist Party (France) politicians
Senators of Val-d'Oise
Officiers of the Légion d'honneur